The Hanriot H.170, H.180, and H.190 were  a family of light utility aircraft produced in France in the 1930s. All introduced in 1934, they appeared side by side at the Paris Air Show that year, the model numbers distinguishing between versions powered by Salmson, Renault, and Régnier engines respectively.

Design and development
In basic construction, the different variants were otherwise almost identical, as largely conventional monoplanes with high, strut-braced wings and fixed, tailskid undercarriage. The pilot and one or two passengers sat in an extensively-glazed, enclosed cabin.

Although usually described as a monoplane, this family of aircraft all featured small, stub wings at the bottom of the fuselage. These carried the fuel tanks and served as a mounting point for the wing struts and undercarriage. An interesting feature was that the upper portion of the rear fuselage was a removable module, allowing it to be replaced with alternative modules for different roles, for example to carry a stretcher, or a second, open cockpit for pilot or gunnery training.

Operational history
The H.182 was the major production version, accounting for 346 out of the total of 392 aircraft built. Most of these were produced as part of a government order for machines to equip the Cercles Aériens Régionaux reserve flying units, with 172 aircraft still operational at the Fall of France in 1940.

Ten more were purchased by the Second Spanish Republic for use in the Spanish Civil War, and 50 aircraft originally ordered by the French government were diverted to Turkey as part of a military aid agreement.

Variants

H.170
 H.170 - two-seat military observation version with Salmson 6Te engine (1 built)
 H.171 - three-seat civil tourer version of H.170 (1 built)
 H.172
 H.172B - two-seat trainer (1 built)
 H.172N - three-seat tourer (7 built)
 H.173 - aerobatic trainer version (1 built)
 H.174 - three-seat trainer (1 built)
 H.175 - liaison aircraft for French Navy (10 built)

H.180
 H.180
 H.180T - three-seat tourer with Renault 4Pdi engine (1 built)
 H.180M - two-seat military observation version with Renault 4Pei engine (1 built)
 H.181 - air ambulance version of H.180T (1 built)
 H.182 - main production version as trainer aircraft for French reserve aviation units.
 H.183 - aerobatic trainer with Renault 438 engine (1 built)
 H.184 - trainer version with uprated version of Renault 4Pei engine (1 built)
 H.185 - two-seat liaison version for French navy (6 built)

H.190
 H.190
 H.190M - two-seat observation aircraft with Régnier 60-01 engine (1 built)
 H.191 - three-seat tourer (1 built)
 H.192
 H.192B - two-seat trainer (1 built)
 H.192N - two-seat civil trainer with Régnier 6Bo.1 engine (9 built)
 H.195 - two-seat liaison aircraft with Régnier 6Bo.1 engine (1 built)

Operators

French Air Force
French Navy

Spanish Republican Air Force

Turkish Air Force

Specifications (H.182)

See also

References

External links

1930s French civil utility aircraft
1930s French military utility aircraft
H.180
High-wing aircraft
Single-engined tractor aircraft
Aircraft first flown in 1934